Michal Barel Hein (מיכל היין; born February 11, 1968) is an Israeli former Olympic windsurfer. She was born in Rehovot, Israel.

Windsurfing career
Her club was Hapoel Tel Aviv, in Tel Aviv, Israel.

Hein finished 10th at the World Championships in February 2000. Hein competed for Israel at the 2000 Summer Olympics, at 32 years of age, in Sydney, Australia, in Sailing--Women's Women's Mistral One Design/Windsurfer, and came in 14th.
.

References

External links
 

Living people
Israeli windsurfers
Olympic sailors of Israel
Israeli female sailors (sport)
1968 births
People from Rehovot
Sailors at the 2000 Summer Olympics – Mistral One Design
Female windsurfers